The Straffan Rail Disaster occurred on 5 October 1853, when a goods train ran into the back of a stationary passenger train  south of Straffan station in County Kildare.

Background
The Great Southern and Western Railway line from Dublin to Cork had only been in operation six years when 18 people died in what is still Ireland's third-worst railway tragedy, having only been surpassed by the Armagh rail disaster of 1889 (80 killed) and the Ballymacarrett rail crash of 1945 (23 killed).

Events
There were a total of 45 passengers in the two first- and three second-class carriages.

Edward Croker Barrington, a solicitor for the company, who was a passenger on the train, directed the fireman, John O'Hara, to signal a warning to a 20-wagon goods train which had been passed in Portarlington and was approaching from behind, so that it might push the train into Dublin. O'Hara was gone 15 minutes when the goods train was seen approaching and, reassured, some of the passengers got back on their train. However, the goods train crashed into the stationary carriages at full speed, smashing through the first-class carriage at the back of the train, overturning the second-class carriage, shearing the roof off another carriage, and driving the rest  the other side of Straffan Station, reduced to "a heap of ruins".

William Hutchinson from Clownings was one of the first on the scene, having gone to the railway line investigate the stalled train. Dr Geoghegan tended the injured, and Edward Kennedy, who was hunting nearby, helped summon aid. The injured were kept in the station house, and three orphaned children were brought to Lyons House.

Inquest and enquiry
The inquest was performed initially at Straffan station house and adjourned to Barry's Hotel at Thirteenth Lock. The victims came from Cork, Mallow, Kenmare, Birr, Laois, Kildare and Dublin, and included Jesse Hall from County Kildare, Daniel and Anastasia McSwiney of Kenmare, TW Jelly of Straboe, John Egan of Birr, Emma Pack of Birr, Kate Hamilton Haimes, (the wife of a mill owner from Mallow, originally identified from a note in her pocket by her maiden name, Kate Smith), Christopher McNally, a solicitor of Dublin, Claire Kirwan from 82 Lwr Abbey St in Dublin, Margaret Leathley from 62 Eccles St in Dublin, Joseph Sherwood a servant boy of the household of Richard Stokes, Cherry Agnes Knapp from London, Margaret Palmer, a cousin of Mrs Knapp, William Bateman a solicitor from Cork, Mrs Latham Blacker from London and four children. A total of £27,000 compensation was paid to victims, the equivalent of €2.37m today.

The unionist Dublin Evening Mail alleged that the bodies of the dead and the dying were plundered by local people, an allegation disproved by the inquest and condemned by the rival Freeman's Journal: "The people did not plunder the dead and dying but, on the contrary, assisted with the greatest alacrity and to the utmost of their power." The only criticism at the inquest was of a carter named Connor, from Celbridge, who refused to carry the wounded until he was given half a crown.

The inquiry found that no warning was given by either red light or detonators. The fireman, John O'Hara, the engine driver, James Gass, and the guard of the luggage train, James Prey, were arrested.

Commenting on the accident, an editorial in The Times of London called for clockwork event recorders to be carried in locked boxes on all trains in the United Kingdom.

Folklore: The Ghost Story
According to Ireland's Own, the Wexford weekly magazine which reports the supernatural, the site of the crash has been haunted by a man with a red lamp ever since.

Allingham Poem

References

Sources 
Eoghan Corry and Jim Tancred: The Annals of Ardclough (2004).

Railway accidents in 1853
Train collisions in the Republic of Ireland
Railway accidents involving fog
Transport in County Kildare
History of County Kildare
1853 in Ireland
Accidents and incidents involving Great Southern and Western Railway
October 1853 events
Train collisions in the United Kingdom
1853 disasters in the United Kingdom